The Sava-class  river monitors were built for the Austro-Hungarian Navy during the mid-1910s. The two ships of the class were assigned to the Danube Flotilla and participated in World War I. The ships survived the war and were transferred to Romania and the newly created Kingdom of Serbs, Croats and Slovenes (later Yugoslavia) as reparations.

Description and construction
They displaced , and their crew consisted of 91 officers and enlisted men. The Sava-class ships were powered by two triple-expansion steam engines, each driving one shaft, using steam generated by two Yarrow boilers driving. They carried  of fuel oil.

The main armament of the Sava-class river monitors was a pair of  L/45 guns in a single turret forward of the conning tower and a pair of  L/10 howitzers in the rear turret. They also mounted a pair of  L/26 anti-aircraft guns, two  L/44 guns, and seven machine guns.

Ships

Careers
In Romanian service, Bucovina (ex-Sava) was fitted for service at sea as an anti-submarine escort, having one of her seven machine guns replaced by one 610 mm depth charge thrower. Otherwise her armament remained unchanged. In Romanian service, she also had a range of 750 nautical miles, more than enough to travel across the greatest East-West extent of the Black Sea, which was 635 nautical miles (the Black Sea was the area of operations of the World War II Romanian Navy).

Notes

Footnotes

References
 

 
 
 
 
 
 
 
 
 

Monitor classes
World War I naval ships of Austria-Hungary
World War I monitors
World War II monitors